Halococcus salifodinae is an extremely halophilic archaeon, first isolated in an Austrian salt mine. It is a coccoid cell with pink pigmentation, its type strain being Blp (= ATCC 51437 = DSM 8989).

References

Further reading

Hanslmeier, Arnold, Stephan Kempe, and Joseph Seckbach, eds. Life on Earth and Other Planetary Bodies. Vol. 24. Springer, 2012.
Gunde-Cimerman, Nina, Aharon Oren, and Ana Plemenitaš, eds. Adaptation to life at high salt concentrations in Archaea, Bacteria, and Eukarya. Vol. 9. Springer, 2006.

External links
LPSN

Type strain of Halococcus salifodinae at BacDive -  the Bacterial Diversity Metadatabase

Euryarchaeota
Archaea described in 1994